Camilla Lefoli Maibom (born 5 July 1990) is a Retired Danish handball player who last played for Ringkøbing Håndbold.

References

1990 births
Living people
People from Svendborg
Danish female handball players
Sportspeople from the Region of Southern Denmark